ViVi (also known as HaSeul & ViVi) is the fifth single album from South Korean girl group Loona's pre-debut project. It was released on April 17, 2017, by Blockberry Creative and distributed by CJ E&M. It is the first solo single by member ViVi who was previously introduced as a member of Loona 1/3, and contains two tracks, "Everyday I Love You", featuring previously revealed member HaSeul, and "Everyday I Need You", featuring then-upcoming member JinSoul.

Track listing

Charts

References

Loona (group) albums
Single albums
2017 singles
Blockberry Creative singles